Sanathnagar is an industrial and residential area in Hyderabad City, Telangana, India, and one of the most densely populated suburbs in India. 
 
In the past, a part of it served as a residential area for officers and workers in the industries located there. The residential area is known as SRT (Single Room Tenements) quarters. It has since grown to include neighboring localities such as Czech Colony, parts of BK Guda, Subhash Nagar Colony, Tulisi Nagar, Jayaprakash Nagar Colony, and the ESI area.

Story
The industrial area of Sanathnagar includes small and medium-scale chemical, pharmaceutical, electrical, and mechanical industries. It also has large industries like Bright Star Rubber, Divi's, Sipra, Gland Pharma, and Lamco along with several major automobile service centers. GM Motors, TATA Motors, Toyota, Chevrolet, Daewoo, Bajaj, Volvo, Skoda, Mercedes-Benz are located here. The main branch of the post office is also located in this industrial area.

The engineering companies Voltas and Allwyn were formerly located in Sanathnagar, along with automobile manufacturer Ashok Leyland and asbestos sheets manufacturer like Hyderabad Industries Ltd.

Now with Bakelyte Hylam made a residential property, purchased and developed by Lodha Group, a gated community is coming up at Sanathnagar with the name CASA Paradiso. Swamy Talkies, an old cinema theater, has also been converted into a apartments. Major national banks such as the State Bank of India, HDFC, State Bank of Hyderabad, Andhra Bank and big retail stores like D-Mart, Agro Mech Industries, Metalika Industries & Steel Utensils manufacturing unit, Metal Industries are also located here. Urbanization can be seen in areas like the Czech colony and others of this suburb.

The Sunday Market located at Sanathnagar-Erragadda main road sells all kinds of second-hand goods and many other miscellaneous items.

Education
The early schools set up in this area include Covells High School, the first school established  in 1964-2021. It was followed in 1965 by St. Theresa's Girls High School. Hindu Public School is the largest school in Sanathnagar.Blue diamond high school1980. Other schools located in this suburb are the Rose Buds High School, Neena High School (established in 1984), Crescent Convent High School (established in 1996), Vasistha Vidyalaya, Vidyanjali High School, Rainbow School, Gautami Vidya Dhamam, Jai Bharati School and the Little Scholars School. The Hindu college for women is a prominent college in the suburb.

Healthcare

St. Theresa's Hospital is one of the oldest hospitals in the area. This hospital has recently undergone renovations to accommodate more wards. The government owned ESI hospital is also present here. A chest hospital, a TB hospital, and a hospital for mental health are among the other government institutions located near the suburb, providing health care for the poor.

Culture
The citizens of this area are generally peaceful, and come from different backgrounds and a variety of religions.

The Hanuman temple at Czech colony is one of the famous sites of Hinduism. Bhadrakali mata temple near Sanathnagar bus stop is one and only Kali Mata temple in Sanathnagar and surrounding areas. Christianity was brought to this area by the Salesian missionaries. Churches in the area include St. Theresa's Church, Baptist Church, and St. Paul's Church at Czech Colony.

The Masjid close to the bus depot is a well-known one called Jafri Masjid. Apart from this there are few other Masjids such as Masjid-e-Quba and Masjid-e-Ibrahimia. The Eid gah near the Jafri Masjid is also well-known where Eid Namaz are being offered.

Recreation

Sanathnagar is known for its parks in its suburbs, creating a natural atmosphere. Laxmi Yadav Park, a notable recent addition, is now among the most beloved parks in the area. Wide open spaces such as the Welfare Ground, Milad Ground, Vinayak Ground, Bhagat Singh park, Veer Savarkar Park and Nehru Ground provide good sporting avenues for the youth. The Sanathnagar-Fathenagar-Balkampet Flyover, providing a good aerial view of the Begumpet airport, is commonly enjoyed by the public in the evenings.

Welfare Ground was one of the biggest open fields for playing cricket. This ground looks like a small cricket stadium. In summer this is occupied with about 300-400 people playing cricket daily. Now it also includes a swimming centre.

Transit

Sanathnagar has a TSRTC bus terminal, linking it to all the major suburbs of Hyderabad and Secunderabad, along with a MMTS station providing local rail connectivity to parts of Hyderabad. Metro Rail is also accessible from Erragadda.

Neighbourhoods
Sanathnagar consists of several other smaller localities such as Fathenagar, BK Guda, Ravindra Nagar Colony, part of Sanjiva Reddy Nagar, Czech Colony, Subhash Nagar Colony, Jayaprakash Nagar Colony, and ESI (Hospital and Quarters). The TRS Governmenet has sanctioned a new RUB connecting Sanathnagar with Balanagar through the Industrial estate road from Toyota showroom leading to SBI Industrial estate branch which will be a 4-lane 100 feet wide road passing under the sanathnagar railway yard. Also a new 2-lane flyover has been sanctioned which will run parallel to the existing Balkampet - Fatehnagar ROB.

Politics 

The Sanathnagar constituency is currently represented in the Telangana Legislative Assembly by Talasani Srinivas Yadav and 101 Constituency Corporator konalu Laxmi Reddy

Business 
Sanathnagar has all the necessary stores ranging from book stores to medical stores. It is one of the largest markets for retail fire works and there are approximately 100 stores during Diwali season.

Notes

External links

Neighbourhoods in Hyderabad, India